Nemir is a 1982 Croatian film directed by Ahmet "Adi" Imamović, starring Asja Jovanović, Igor Galo, Mladen Budišćak and Vera Zima.

References

External links
 

1982 films
1980s Croatian-language films
Croatian drama films
1982 directorial debut films
1982 drama films
Yugoslav drama films